was a Japanese Orientalist.

A native of Yamanashi Prefecture, he studied Pali and Sanskrit at the Tokyo University of Foreign Studies, and graduated with a BA from the University of Tokyo. Prior to World War II, he taught in Taiwan, then a Japanese colony. After the war, he taught Islamic History at Keio University until his death.

He began as a Buddhist scholar, but then turned his attention to Islam, becoming a pioneering Arabist in Japan. He was the first one to render the One Thousand and One Nights from the original Arabic into Japanese. He died just before the publication of a supplementary volume to his twelve-volume translation, which contains the stories of Ali Baba and Aladdin. Six more volumes were later produced by Osamu Ikeda (池田 修) to complete the series.

Major works
『玄奘三蔵: 史実西遊記』岩波新書、1952年
『三大陸周遊記』（翻訳）河出書房、1954年（角川文庫、1961年）
『サラセン文化』弘文堂、1955年
『アラビアの医術』中公新書、1965年（平凡社ライブラリー、1996年）
『アラビアン・ナイト　全18巻』（翻訳）平凡社東洋文庫、1966年-1992年
『イスラム世界』河出書房新社、1968年（河出文庫、1989年）
『アラビアン・ナイトの世界』講談社現代新書、1970年（平凡社ライブラリー、1995年）
『イスラムの蔭に』河出書房新社、1975年（河出文庫、1991年）
『イスラムの時代』講談社、1977年

References

Japanese Arabists
Japanese orientalists
Translators from Arabic
1903 births
1983 deaths
Translators of One Thousand and One Nights
20th-century translators
University of Tokyo alumni
Tokyo University of Foreign Studies alumni